The Church of Jesus Christ of Latter-day Saints in New Jersey refers to the Church of Jesus Christ of Latter-day Saints (LDS Church) and its members in New Jersey.

Official church membership as a percentage of general population was 0.37% in 2014, making New Jersey the lowest percentage of LDS members as a percentage of the population within the United States. According to the 2014 Pew Forum on Religion & Public Life survey, less than 1% of New Jersey residents self-identify themselves most closely with the LDS Church.

History

Orson Pratt and Lyman E. Johnson, future leaders of LDS Church, preached as missionaries in New Jersey in 1832. They baptized more than 100 while traveling through Ohio, Pennsylvania, and New Jersey. Parley P. Pratt arrived in Northern New Jersey as a missionary in 1837. Benjamin Winchester and Jedediah M. Grant arrived the same year to preach in Southern New Jersey.

The first branch, the Toms River Branch was organized in 1838. In November of 1845, the Church sent a directive that all Latter-day Saints along the Eastern Seaboard prepare to move to the Rocky Mountains. Some New Jersey members were among those that traveled to California in 1846 on the ship Brooklyn. There were 21 organized branches in 1848. Church membership in the 1850's and 1860's dwindled in New Jersey as missionary work was occasional and those that did join were encouraged to go west.

In 1893 when the Eastern-States Mission was re-established, but Church activity was slow to resume. By 1920 a branch was organized in Newark. Other congregations were established. The Newark Branch moved to East Orange and became the East Orange Ward of the New York Stake in 1934. The East Orange Ward eventually moved to Short Hills and was renamed the Short Hills Ward September 9, 1953, where it still remains today. In 1960, the New Jersey Stake was created.

In 2013, a new meetinghouse was built in Newark, New Jersey, a  church topped by a  steeple adjacent to the Newark Broad Street station.

In 2014, a meetinghouse was built in Camden, New Jersey.

David L. Buckner formed the first Young Adult stake in the New York City region on June 18, 2018.

Stakes
As of February 2023, New Jersey had the following stakes (with the stake center in New Jersey):

Missions
Missionary work started shortly after the Church was organized in 1830. The Eastern States Mission, the Church's 2nd mission (behind the British Mission), was established on May 6, 1839 but discontinued in April of 1850. The Eastern States Mission was re-established in January 1893. On June 20, 1974, it was renamed the New York New York Mission. The New Jersey Morristown Mission was organized from the New York New York Mission on July 1, 1987. The New Jersey Cherry Hill was organized in 1995 then discontinued in 2010 and made up portions of the New Jersey Morristown and the Pennsylvania Philadelphia Missions. As of June 2021, the entire state was covered either by the Morristown or Philadelphia Missions.

Temples
Two temples, directly adjacent to the state, serve members in New Jersey.

See also

 The Church of Jesus Christ of Latter-day Saints membership statistics (United States)
New Jersey: Religion

References

External links
 Newsroom (New Jersey)
 ComeUntoChrist.org Latter-day Saints Visitor site
 The Church of Jesus Christ of Latter-day Saints Official site

Christianity in New Jersey
Latter Day Saint movement in New Jersey
New Jersey